Rachel Aba Yankey, OBE (born 1 November 1979) is an English former footballer who played for the England national team. She played as a left winger or forward. She left Arsenal after 13 years in December 2016 at the end of her contract. She is ranked among the Arsenal Ladies Legends.

Since making her debut in 1997, Yankey appeared on 129 occasions for England and at the time became the most capped player ever to play for England, ahead of male goalkeeper Peter Shilton with 125 (though this record has since been beaten by several female players). She was the second English female player, after Gillian Coultard, to make a century of international appearances. Yankey was part of the Great Britain squad for the 2012 London Olympics.

Early life
Yankey began playing football as the only girl in a boys' team. Aged eight she shaved her hair off, pretending to be a boy called 'Ray' (an acronym of her birth names). She was able to play in the boys' team for two years before her real identity was discovered.

Yankey joined Mill Hill United at youth level after the club's manager, Russell Mountford, attended an annual general meeting (AGM) at Yankey's boys' club. She also represented Brent in the London Youth Games as a youngster, and was inducted into their Hall of Fame in 2011

Club career
Yankey's senior playing career began at the age of 16, playing for Arsenal, when she spent a short time on loan with Laval Dynamites, a Canadian team, and then moved to Fulham in 2000.

It was here that she was registered as the first professional female footballer in England. She joined Birmingham City before the 2004–05 season, and then, after being released from Birmingham, rejoined Arsenal for the 2005–06 season after a short spell with the New Jersey Wildcats of the W-League in the United States. Yankey, along with England teammate Rachel Unitt, played for the Wildcats for the last seven games of the season, and helped them win the W-League championship. In 2011, she helped Arsenal to another domestic treble.

In January 2014 Yankey signed a new two-year contract with Arsenal. She was praised by the club's general manager, Vic Akers: "She remains a key part of the team and her ability and experience will be invaluable in the season ahead." As of 30 December 2016 Yankey was released by Arsenal at the end of her contract.

International career
In August 1997 Yankey made her senior England debut, scoring in a 4–0 win over Scotland at Almondvale Stadium.

Yankey became arguably the most famous female footballer in England, having modelled new England kits, and appeared on the FA women's homepage header. She is also noted for appearing in the BBC's online BBC Sport 'Academy Masterclasses' mini-series, teaching young footballers basic soccer skills.

In May 2009, Yankey was one of the first 17 female players to be given central contracts by The Football Association. However, in August 2009 she was surprisingly left out of coach Hope Powell's 22–player squad for Euro 2009 with Powell believing that her form did not justify a call–up. Yankey was also overlooked for the 2011 Women's World Cup qualifiers against Malta and Turkey. But after a return to form with Arsenal Ladies, she was recalled by Powell for the 2010 Cyprus Cup and won her 90th and 91st caps – as a 76th-minute substitute for Jessica Clarke in a 1–0 win over South Africa and as a starter in a 1–0 defeat to Canada.

A return to form at both club and international level saw Yankey being selected regularly again by Powell, and on 29 July 2010 Yankey became the second Englishwoman after Gillian Coultard to earn 100 caps during a home World Cup qualifier against Turkey. Yankey, who was captain for the night, scored a goal and played the entire 90 minutes as England won 3–0.

In a World Cup warm–up friendly against the United States, Yankey hit the second goal in England's 2–1 win at Brisbane Road. At the final tournament Yankey netted in England's 2–0 group B win over Japan after coming on as a half–time substitute.

In June 2012 Yankey equalled Coultard's record of 119 appearances for England in a 4–0 win in Slovenia. She set a new record of 120 caps by playing in England's 3–0 win over Croatia at Bescot Stadium on 19 September 2012. In June 2013 Yankey played in a 1–1 friendly draw with Japan and broke Peter Shilton's all-time national record of 125 caps. She was included in the England squad which performed poorly at UEFA Women's Euro 2013 and was eliminated in the first round.

Incoming England manager Mark Sampson left Yankey out of his first squad in December 2013. He stressed that "the door is firmly open" for her to come back in.

Great Britain Olympic

In June 2012 Yankey was named in the 18–player Great Britain squad for the 2012 London Olympics.

International goals

Scores and results list England's goal tally first.

Coaching career
Yankey was announced as a first team coach of London Bees in June 2018. Following the departure of Luke Swindlehurst in February 2019 to become head coach of Barnet's under-18s team, Yankey was appointed Head Coach. She left the club in May 2019.

Honours

Arsenal
FA Women's National Premier League (6) – 1996–97, 2005–06, 2006–07, 2007–08, 2008–09, 2009–10
FA Women's Cup (9) – 1998, 1999, 2006, 2007, 2008, 2009, 2011, 2013, 2014
FA Women's Premier League Cup (4) – 1998, 1999, 2007, 2009
UEFA Women's Cup (1) – 2007	
FA WSL (2) – 2011, 2012
	
Fulham
FA Women's National Premier League (1) – 2002–03
FA Women's Cup (2) – 2002, 2003	
FA Women's Premier League Cup (2) – 2002, 2003
	
New Jersey Wildcats 	
W-League (1) – 2005

Individual
Nationwide International Player of the Year (2004–05) season
London Youth Games Hall of Famer (Class of 2011)

 Women's Super League Hall of Fame: 2021

Yankey was appointed Member of the Order of the British Empire (MBE) in the 2006 New Year Honours and Officer of the Order of the British Empire (OBE) in the 2014 New Year Honours, both for services to football.

Personal life

When not playing, or practicing, Yankey works as a coach in schools, teaching football to children. This includes hosting a CBeebies programme, Footy Pups. It was reported that Yankey's middle name came about as her mother was a fan of ABBA, the Swedish pop group. However, in 2010 Yankey indicated that it was actually related to her Ghanaian heritage.

References

External links

Short profile  – from TheFA.com
Player page – from the Arsenal homepage
Short profile  – from the New Jersey Wildcats homepage
BBC Academy – which contains the Masterclasses Mini-Series

1979 births
Living people
Arsenal W.F.C. players
Fulham L.F.C. players
Birmingham City W.F.C. players
Notts County L.F.C. players
England women's international footballers
English women's footballers
FA Women's National League players
Officers of the Order of the British Empire
English Football Hall of Fame inductees
English sportspeople of Ghanaian descent
Black British sportswomen
FIFA Century Club
Women's Super League players
2011 FIFA Women's World Cup players
2007 FIFA Women's World Cup players
USL W-League (1995–2015) players
Footballers at the 2012 Summer Olympics
Olympic footballers of Great Britain
Footballers from Greater London
Women's association football wingers
Women's association football forwards
Female association football managers
English women's football managers
English expatriate sportspeople in the United States
WSL Hall of Fame inductees